St. Margaret's Church is often used to mean St Margaret's, Westminster, which forms part of the UNESCO World Heritage Site at Westminster, Greater London. 

It may also refer to:

America
St. Margaret's Church, Barbados

Australia
St. Margaret's Uniting Church, Hackett, Australian Capital Territory

Italy 
Church of Saint Margaret, Brugherio

Malta
Church of St Margaret, Sannat
St Margaret's Chapel, San Gwann

Norway
St. Margaret's Church, Oslo

Romania
St. Margaret's Church, Mediaș

South Africa
St Margaret of Scotland, Bedfordview

United Kingdom
St Margaret's Church, Abbotsley, Cambridgeshire
St Margaret of Scotland, Aberdeen, Aberdeen
 St Margaret's Church, Aberlour, Moray
St. Margaret's Church, Aspley, Nottingham
St Margaret's Church, Barking, London Borough of Barking and Dagenham
St Margaret's Church, Burnham Norton, Norfolk
St Margaret's Church, Burnage, Greater Manchester
St Margaret's The Queen, Buxted, East Sussex
St Margaret's Church, Finchley, London Borough of Barnet
St. Margaret's Church, Fletton, Peterborough
St. Margaret's Church, Great Barr, Walsall
St Margaret's Church, Hales, Norfolk
St Margaret's Church, Halliwell, Greater Manchester
St Margaret's Church, Halstead, Kent
St Margaret's Church, High Bentham, North Yorkshire
St Margaret's Church, Hopton, Norfolk
St Margaret's Church, Hornby, Lancashire

St Margaret's Church, Horsmonden, Kent
St Margaret's Church, Ifield, West Sussex
St. Margaret, Ilketshall, Ilketshall, Suffolk
King's Lynn Minster (St Margaret's Church, King's Lynn, Norfolk
St Margaret's, Lee, London
St Margaret's Church, Leicester
Church of St. Margaret of Antioch, Liverpool
St Margaret and St James' Church, Long Marton, Cumbria
St Margaret's Church, Lowestoft, Suffolk
St Margaret's Church Prestwich, Manchester
St Margaret's Church, Oxford, Oxfordshire
St Margaret's Church, Putney, London Borough of Wandsworth
St Margaret's Church, Roath, Cardiff
St. Margaret's Church, Rochester, Kent
St Margaret's Church, Rottingdean, East Sussex
Stanstead St Margarets, Hertfordshire
St Margarets, Toft Monks, Beccles, Norfolk
St Margaret's Church, West Hoathly, West Sussex
St Margaret's, Westminster, London
St Margaret's Church, Wolstanton, Staffordshire
St Margaret's Church, Wrenbury, Cheshire
St Margaret's Church, Wincobank, Sheffield
St Margaret Lothbury, City of London
St Margaret Pattens, City of London
Church of St Margaret, Streatley, Bedfordshire

St Margaret’s Church, Paston, Norfolk
St Margaret's Church, Whaddon, Gloucestershire

See also
St. Margaret’s Episcopal Church (disambiguation)
Saint Margaret (disambiguation)
St Margaret's School (disambiguation)